Huluween Dragstravaganza is a 2022 Halloween-themed variety special that premiered on October 1, 2022, exclusively through Hulu. The variety special stars Ginger Minj and Monét X Change, with drag legends, RuPaul's Drag Race and Dragula alums.

Background 
A teaser was released showing Ginger Minj and Monét X Change stuck in a old television. This variety show was the start of Hulu's yearly Huluween block. An original song for the show was released on September 16, 2022. On September 21, 2022, a trailer was released which confirmed that there would be five original songs. The variety show contains many skits with various references to many classic horror films. The show premiered on October 1, 2022. One of the actors, Jackie Beat, was one of the writers for the variety special. The special also have a special guest: Kesha, who performed her song "Cannibal".

Plot 
Ginger Minj and Monét X Change were getting ready for a show in West Hollywood until they stumbled onto an old television that appears to be haunted. When Monét hits the haunted television, the two were teleported to the "Land of Huluween".

Cast 
 Ginger Minj
 Monét X Change
 Lady Bunny
 Manila Luzon
 Mo Heart
 Jackie Beat
 Selene Luna
 Jujubee
 Landon Cider
 Mario Diaz

Soundtrack 

Huluween Dragstravaganza (Original Soundtrack) is a soundtrack extended play that was released on September 30, 2022, through Hollywood Records. The soundtrack contains five original songs from the cast of the variety show. On September 16, 2022, Hulu released the first original song called: "The Big Opening".

Track listing

References 

2022 American television series debuts
English-language television shows
Hulu original programming